As the Canadian province with the largest population, Ontario has a particularly prominent role in Canadian music. The provincial capital city of Toronto, Canada's largest municipality, is home to much of the English Canadian music industry and many individual musicians, and the most popular destination for musicians from other parts of Canada, besides French-Canadian musicians, looking to advance their careers. Toronto also supports Canadian music as the centre of English language media in Canada. Hamilton, Ottawa, Kingston and Guelph have also been important centres for Canadian music.

In classical music, the Toronto Symphony Orchestra, and the National Arts Centre Orchestra are two of the most renowned orchestras in the world. Many smaller Ontario cities have orchestras of their own as well. The Canadian Opera Company, also based in Toronto, is the country's largest and most influential producer of opera productions.

Other institutions in the province include the Royal Conservatory of Music, MuchMusic, and concert venues such as Roy Thomson Hall, Massey Hall and the National Arts Centre. Record labels in the province include MapleMusic, DROG Records, Duke Street, Sonic Unyon, Three Gut, Zunior, Linus Entertainment, and the Canadian divisions of most major international labels.

Ontario music organizations
Central Ontario Musicians' Association
Country Music Association of Ontario
Folk Music Ontario
MusicOntario
Ontario Arts Council
Ontario Music Association
Toronto Alliance for the Performing Arts
Toronto Musicians' Association
Toronto Symphony Orchestra
Ontario Music Festivals Association

Music Festivals

Rock on the River
Boots and Hearts Music Festival
Burlington's Sound of Music Festival
Goderich Celtic Roots Festival
Hamilton Supercrawl
Havelock Country Jamboree
Mariposa Folk Festival
Northern Lights Festival Boréal
Ottawa Bluesfest
OVO Fest
Rock the Park

Musicians
For a list of musicians and musical groups from Ontario, please see List of Ontario musicians.

References